Nerio I Acciaioli or Acciajuoli (full name Rainerio; died 25 September 1394) was the actual ruler of the Duchy of Athens from 1385. Born to a family of Florentine bankers, he became the principal agent of his influential kinsman, Niccolò Acciaioli, in Frankish Greece in 1360. He purchased large domains in the Principality of Achaea and administered them independently of the absent princes. He hired mercenaries and conquered Megara, a strategically important fortress in the Duchy of Athens, in 1374 or 1375. His troops again invaded the duchy in 1385. The Catalans who remained loyal to King Peter IV of Aragon could only keep the Acropolis of Athens, but they were also forced into surrender in 1388.

Nerio and his son-in-law, Theodore I Palaiologos, Despot of the Morea, occupied the Lordship of Argos and Nauplia. Nerio received Nauplia, but the Venetians expelled his troops from the town. Nerio was captured by a mercenary commander, Pedro de San Superano, in 1389. He was released after he promised to support the Venetians to seize Argos from Theodore I. He had to cede parts of his domains to Venice as a guarantee to keep his promise, but he could not convince his son-in-law to surrender Argos. Nerio's troops captured the Duchy of Neopatras from the Catalans in 1390, but the Ottoman sultan Bayezid I conquered the territory in 1393. Thereafter Nerio paid a yearly tribute to the sultan. King Ladislaus of Naples, who claimed suzerainty over Frankish Greece, invested Nerio with the Duchy of Athens on 11 January 1394. In his last will, Nerio distributed his domains between his younger daughter, Francesca, his illegitimate son, Antonio, and the church of Saint Mary (the Parthenon) of Athens.

Early life

Nerio (or Rainerio) was the second son of Jacobo Acciaioli and Bartolomea Riccasoli. The Acciaioli were a Florentine banking family who regularly lent money to the Angevin monarchs of Naples in the 14th century. The Angevins also required their assistance in the financial administration of their possessions in Frankish Greece. The Acciaioli set up their first bank office in the Principality of Achaea in 1331. Jacobo Acciaioli's second cousin, Niccolò Acciaioli, was a close confidant of Catherine of Valois-Courtenay, the titular Latin Empress of Constantinople. Catherine's son, Robert of Taranto, bought Achaea with the Acciaioli's financial support in 1332. Niccolò seized large estates in Achaea during the following decades, but his children showed little interest in the Greek affairs. He decided to bequeath Italian estates to Nerio already in 1359, although they were only distant relatives.

Frankish Greece

Aristocrat

Niccolò Acciaioli persuaded Pope Innocent VI to appoint Nerio's younger brother, John, to the important Archbishopric of Patras in Achaea in May 1360. Nerio was sent to the Peloponnese to secure his brother's installation. Next year, Niccolò and John Acciaioli decided to arrange Nerio's marriage with Florence Sanudo, Duchess of the Archipelago (or Naxos). Flerence's suzerains, Queen Joan I of Naples and Robert of Taranto supported their plan and forbade Florence to marry without their consent, but the Venetians abducted her to prevent the marriage. Florence was first taken to Crete, then to Venice, where she was given in marriage to her cousin, Nicholas II Sanudo, in 1364.

Niccolò Acciaioli adopted Nerio as his son in 1362. Robert of Taranto's wife, Marie of Bourbon, sold two Achaean baronies, Vostitza and Nivelet, to Nerio for 6,000 ducats in 1363 or 1364. The transaction made him the master of the whole coastline between Corinth and Patras. Niccolò Acciaioli died on 8 November 1365. His eldest son, Angelo, inherited Corinth, but he mortgaged it to Nerio who took up his seat in the town. Thereafter Nerio was the actual ruler of  northeastern Achaea. Although Philip of Taranto (who had succeeded Robert as prince of Achaea) confirmed Angelo's hereditary right to Corinth in 1371, Angelo and his heirs could not redeem the town from Nerio. Pope Gregory XI styled Nerio as "lord of the town of Corinth" in a letter in November 1372, showing that the Pope regarded Nerio as the town's ruler. Nerio was one of the Christian leaders whom the Pope urged to make an alliance against the Ottoman Turks, but the Christian rulers' conflicts prevented them from attending a crusader congress at Thebes.

Conquests

Joan I of Naples, who inherited Achaea from Philip of Taranto in 1373, confirmed Nerio's possessions and titles in the principality. Nerio took advantage of the conflicts between the Catalans of the Duchy of Athens and the officials whom Frederick the Simple, King of Sicily, appointed to administer the duchy. He captured Megara with the support of its burghers and imprisoned its Catalan commander, Francis Lunel, in late 1374 or early 1375. Megara controlled the road between Thebes and Athens. Joan I leased Achaea to the Knights Hospitallers for five years in the summer of 1376. The Hospitallers hired the Navarrese Companya group of mercenaries from Navarre, Gascogne and Italyin June 1378. Nerio made contact with one of the Navarrese commanders, Juan de Urtubia, and persuaded him to invade the Duchy of Athens in early 1379. The Navarrese laid siege to Thebes and the burghers who supported Nerio convinced the defenders to surrender before June 1379.

The Catalans of Athens held a general assembly and acknowledged King Peter IV of Aragon as their lawful ruler on 20 May 1380. The Navarrese continued their campaign and captured Livadeia in late 1380 or 1381. Nerio seized both Thebes and Livadeia from the Navarrese at an unspecified date. Historian Kenneth Setton proposes that he most probably bought Thebes from two Navarrese commanders, Pedro de San Superano and Berard de Varvassa, after Urtubia died in 1381. San Superano and Varvassa returned to Achaea and swore fealty to Philip of Taranto's nephew, James of Baux, who had laid claim to the principality. Nerio made peace with Peter IV's vicar-general, Philip Dalmau, who left Athens in the spring of 1382. The Navarrese started expanding their rule towards Corinth, but Nerio concluded an alliance with Theodore I Palaiologos, Despot of the Morea, against them. Nerio also entered into negotiations with the Venetian officials of Euboea to organize joint military actions against the Turks who were making raids against the Greek coasts.

Nerio's troops invaded the Duchy of Athens and occupied most parts of Attica and Boeotia in 1385. They occupied the lower town of Athens, but could not capture the Acropolis from Dalmau's deputy, Raymond de Vilanova. Historian Peter Lock says that Nerio seized Thebes from the Navarrese during the siege of the Acropolis. A Venetian document referred to him as the "ruler of Corinth and the duchy of Athens" on 7 July 1385. Nerio styled himself as "lord of the castellany of Corinth, the duchy of Athens and their dependencies" in a letter of grant on 15 January 1387. Both documents show that he had taken possession of most of the duchy in 1385. He also defeated a group of Turk marauders with Venetian support on 6 February 1386. On 17 April 1387, Peter IV's successor, John I of Aragon, offered Nerio to renew the peace, but Nerio's troops did not abandon the siege of the Acropolis, although a plague had forced him to move to Thebes. The occupation of the duchy became his principal aim and he did not pay the full rent of the galleys that he had hired from Venice against the Turks. The Venetians accused him of inciting the Turks to invade Venetian territories in the autumn of 1387.

Duke of Athens

Nerio's troops captured the Acropolis on 2 May 1388, putting an end to the Catalans' rule in the Duchy of Athens. Nerio hired Italian and Greek officials to administer the duchy and made Greek the language of state administration. He also allowed the Greek Orthodox archbishop of Athens to settle in the lower town. The Catalans still preserved the Duchy of Neopatras. Nerio dispatched his troops to continue the conquest of Catalan territories, but his alliance with Theodore I Palaiologos brought him into conflict with Venice. Pietro Cornaro, Lord of Argos and Nauplia, died in 1388. His widow, Maria of Enghien, who was the heiress of the lordship, started negotiations about the transfer of both towns to the Venetians. Theodore I and Nerio invaded the lordship, with Theodore taking Argos and Nerio capturing Nauplia. On 12 December 1388, Maria sold the lordship to Venice. The Venetians made an alliance with Pedro de San Superan and Paolo Foscari, Archbishop of Patras, and sent commissioners to take possession of both towns. . They captured Nauplia, but could not force Theodore I to surrender Argos. They prohibited the delivery of iron and plowshares to Athens and the Morea. Later, they stopped the import of figs and currants from Athens on 22 June 1389.

San Superano invited Nerio to Vostitza (that had become an important fortress of the Navarrese Company) to start negotiations about Argos with him. Nerio accepted the invitation, but San Superano captured him on 10 September 1389. Nerio was imprisoned in the castle of Listrina (near Vostitza). Nerio's brother, Donato, persuaded the Florentine government to send envoys to Venice, demanding the release of Nerio. Amadeus of Savoy, Lord of Pineroloa claimant to the Principality of Achaeaalso assured Donato Acciaioli of his support in early 1390. Donato proposed to cede Athens, Thebes and movables as pledge to Venetians for Nerio's support for the surrender of Argos to them. The Venetian castellan of Modon and Coron and other Venetian officials had a meeting with Nerio near Vostitza on 22 May 1390. Nerio promised the Venetians that he would persuade his son-in-law to abandon Argos. After he ceded Megara to the Venetians and sent his daughter, Francesca, as a hostage to Euboea, the Venetians achieved his release in late 1390. He also gave his personal property in Corinth as a pledge to the Venetians and he appropriated church property to pay his ransom to the Navarrese. Nerio could not persuade Theodore to surrender Argos, which put an end to their alliance.

Nerio's troops captured Neopatras before the end of 1390. King Ladislaus of Naples appointed Nerio as his vicar-general in Achaea and in Lepanto in 1391, but Ladislaus had no authority in the principality. Amadeus of Savoy sent envoys to Athens to secure Nerio's support for himself. On 29 December 1391, Nerio recognized Amadeus as his suzerain in return for a promise of the restoration of his Achaean estates, but Amadeus could never assert his authority in the principality. Nerio dispatched Lodovico Aliotti, Archbishop of Athens, to Ladislaus of Naples to achieve the legitimization of his rule in Athens. Ladislaus accepted the offer and granted the Duchy of Athens to Nerio and his legitimate male heirs on 11 January 1394.

The Ottoman sultan Bayezid I launched an invasion of Thessaly in late 1393. The Turks captured Neopatras and Livadeia and Nerio agreed to pay a yearly tribute to the sultan in early 1394. Nerio fell seriously ill and completed his "eccentric" last will on 17 September. He bequeathed Athens to the church of Saint Mary (the Parthenon) of Athens and ordered the restoration of the church property that he had seized to pay his ransom. He made his younger daughter, Francesca, his principal heiress, only leaving money to his elder daughter, Bartolomea. He bequeathed Thebes and Livadeia to his illegitimate son, Antonio. Nerio died on 25 September. He was buried in the Parthenon. His title of duke of Athens was inherited by his brother, Donato, but an Ottoman attack against Athens forced him to cede the town to Venice.

Family

Nerio's wife, Agnes de' Saraceni, was the daughter of Saraceno de' Saraceni, a Venetian burgher living in Euboea. They married before 1381. She administered Athens and Corinth during Nerio's captivity. She sent James Petri, Bishop of Argos to Venice to achieve the release of her husband in 1389. She died before Nerio made his last will.

The elder of the two daughters of Nerio by Agnes, Bartolomea, was famed for her beauty, according to the Byzantine historian, Laonikos Chalkokondyles. She was given in marriage to Theodore I Palaiologos in 1385. Her younger sister, Francesca, became the wife of Carlo I Tocco. Nerio's favoritism towards Francesca in his last will caused a conflict between his two sons-in-law, because the former claimed Corinth for himself. Nerio's illegitimate son, Antonio, was born to Nerio's lover, Maria Rendi. Antonio seized the Duchy of Athens in 1403.

References

Sources

|-

1394 deaths
Acciaioli family
Dukes of Athens
Year of birth unknown
History of Corinth
14th-century births
14th-century rulers in Europe
Barons of Vostitsa
14th-century people of the Republic of Florence